John Weston (died c. 1433), of Coventry, Worcester and Warwick, was an English politician.

He was a Member (MP) of the Parliament of England for Warwick in January 1404, 1406, 1410 and 1411, for Worcester in 1410, May 1413, November 1414, 1415 and 1419, and for Worcestershire in 1420.

References

14th-century births
1433 deaths
English MPs January 1404
Politicians from Coventry
English MPs 1406
English MPs 1410
English MPs May 1413
English MPs November 1414
English MPs 1415
English MPs 1419
English MPs 1420
Members of the Parliament of England for Warwick
Members of the Parliament of England for Worcester
Members of the Parliament of England for Worcestershire